The discography of American rapper Obie Trice consists of two major-label studio albums, three independent albums, fifteen singles, and four mixtapes. His major-label albums were released via Eminem's Shady/Interscope Records.

Albums

Studio albums

Compilation albums
 2009: Special Reserve

Mixtapes
2003: The Bar Is Open (with DJ Green Lantern)
2006: Bar Shots (with DJ Whoo Kid)
2007: The Most Under Rated (with DJ Whoo Kid)
2012: Watch the Chrome (with DJ Whoo Kid)

Singles

As lead artist

Guest appearances

Music videos

Notes

A  "Snitch" did not enter the Hot R&B/Hip-Hop Songs chart, but peaked at number 11 on the Bubbling Under R&B/Hip-Hop Singles chart, which acts as a 25-song extension to the Hot R&B/Hip-Hop Songs chart.

References 

Hip hop discographies
Discographies of American artists